The AeroVironment Nano Hummingbird or Nano Air Vehicle (NAV) is a tiny, remote controlled aircraft built to resemble and fly like a hummingbird, developed in the United States by AeroVironment, Inc. to specifications provided by the Defense Advanced Research Projects Agency (DARPA). The Hummingbird is equipped with a small video camera for surveillance and reconnaissance purposes and has a flight endurance of up to 11 minutes. It can fly outdoors, or enter a doorway to investigate indoor environments. It was announced to the public on 17 February 2011.

Specifications
DARPA contributed $4 million to AeroVironment since 2006 to create a prototype "hummingbird-like" aircraft for the Nano Air Vehicle (NAV) program. The aircraft can climb and descend vertically; fly sideways left and right; forward and backward; rotate clockwise and counter-clockwise; and hover in mid-air. The artificial hummingbird maneuvers using its flapping wings for propulsion and attitude control. This includes the systems required for flight: batteries, motors, and communications systems; as well as the video camera payload.

Technical goals
DARPA established flight test milestones for the Hummingbird to achieve and the finished prototype met all of them, and even exceeded some of these objectives:

The device is bigger and heavier than a typical real hummingbird, but is smaller and lighter than the largest hummingbird varieties. It could be deployed to perform reconnaissance and surveillance in urban environments or on battlefields, and might perch on windowsills or power lines, or enter buildings to observe its surroundings, relaying camera views back to its operator. According to DARPA,
the Nano Air Vehicle's configuration will "provide the warfighter with unprecedented capability for urban mission operations."

References

External links

 Press release
 Videos of the Nano Hummingbird in action
 DARPA Nano Air Vehicle web page
 DARPA Nano Air Vehicle Program: Fact Sheet

Nano Hummingbird
Surveillance
2010s United States experimental aircraft
Unmanned aerial vehicles of the United States
Ornithopters
Micro air vehicles